Azad Asgarov,  (born August 20, 1971) is an Azerbaijani mixed martial artist and pankration world champion.

Biography
Azad was born in a small village, near the area of Sabirabad, Azerbaijan.  In 1987, Asgarov became champion of the USSR on the Greco-Roman wrestling.

Martial arts career
Azad had 50 fights on the professional ring, in which he won forty five fights, two draws and lost three fights due to his injuries. His rivals got to the last round of the fight only three times, the rest gave up in the first minutes of the fight.

Personal life
Azad has also served in the army and has nine brothers.

References

External links
Official Azad Asgarov Website

Azerbaijani male mixed martial artists
Welterweight mixed martial artists
Mixed martial artists utilizing Greco-Roman wrestling
Azerbaijani male sport wrestlers
1971 births
Living people
People from Sabirabad